Gladiovalva aizpuruai is a moth of the family Gelechiidae. It was described by Vives in 1990. It is found in the Czech Republic, Slovakia, Hungary and Spain.

The larvae feed on Rumex acetosa.

References

Moths described in 1990
Gladiovalva